Gary Ralfe is a South African businessman and managing director of De Beers.

Ralfe was educated at Michaelhouse School, South Africa and the University of Cambridge. In 1966, he joined Anglo American. Since 1974, he has effectively worked for De Beers. He was appointed a director of De Beers in 1990 and became the managing director of De Beers globally in 1998.

References
De Beers Group Directorate

Alumni of Michaelhouse
Year of birth missing (living people)
Living people
South African businesspeople
Alumni of the University of Cambridge